The Estoril Open (also known as the Millennium Estoril Open for sponsorship purposes) is an ATP clay court tennis tournament held in the Portuguese Riviera. The event take place at the sports complex of Clube de Ténis do Estoril in Cascais. The tournament was created in 2015 to replace the historic Portugal Open, which was canceled due to lack of sponsorships. The tournament was created by former Dutch tennis player Benno van Veggel and Portuguese football agent Jorge Mendes.

Results

Singles

Doubles

References

External links
 
 ATP tournament profile

 
Tennis tournaments in Portugal
Clay court tennis tournaments
Recurring sporting events established in 2015
2015 establishments in Portugal
ATP Tour 250
Sport in Estoril